UVT Aero is Russian airline headquartered in Kazan. Its main base is Kazan International Airport.

History 
On 8 July 2015 Tatarstan's Republic new airline UVT Aero was awarded with a license to carry out commercial passenger and charter flights, and also a license for freight transportation. In July 2015 regular flights from Bugulma to Moscow and from Kazan to Moscow and St Petersburg were launched. In August 2015 UVT Aero launched flights to Simferopol and Sochi. UVT Aero also participates in serving subsidized routes of federal importance.

Destinations 
UVT Aero serves following destinations:

Armenia 
Yerevan – Zvartnots Airport

Georgia 
Batumi – Alexander Kartveli Batumi International Airport seasonal
Tbilisi – Shota Rustaveli Tbilisi International Airport

Russia 
Astrakhan Oblast
 Astrakhan – Narimanovo Airport
 Bashkortstan
 Ufa – Ufa International Airport
 Chelyabinsk Oblast
 Chelyabinsk – Balandino Airport
 Crimea
 Simferopol – Simferopol International Airport
 Dagestan
 Makhachkala – Uytash Airport
 Kemerovo Oblast
 Novokuznetsk – Spichenkovo Airport  (begins 4 January 2020)
 Krasnodar Krai
 Gelendzhik – Gelendzhik Airport  Seasonal
 Krasnodar – Pashkovsky Airport
 Sochi – Adler-Sochi International Airport
 Nizhny Novgorod Oblast
 Nizhny Novgorod – Strigino Airport
 Novosibirsk Oblast
 Novosibirsk – Tolmachevo Airport
 Perm Krai
 Perm – Bolshoye Savino Airport
 Moscow / Moscow Oblast
 Moscow Domodedovo Airport
 Zhukovsky International Airport
 Saint Petersburg / Leningrad Oblast
 Pulkovo International Airport
 Sverdlovsk Oblast
 Yekaterinburg – Koltsovo Airport  (begins 4 January 2020)
 Tatarstan
 Bugulma – Bugulma Airport Base
 Kazan – Kazan International Airport Base
 Nizhnekamsk / Naberezhnye Chelny – Begishevo Airport focus city
 Tyumen Oblast
 Khanty-Mansi Autonomous Okrug
 Khanty-Mansiysk – Khanty-Mansiysk Airport
 Nizhnevartovsk – Nizhnevartovsk Airport
 Surgut – Surgut International Airport
 Voronezh Oblast
 Voronezh – Chertovitskoye Airport
 Yaroslavl Oblast
 Yaroslavl – Tunoshna Airport

Fleet 

The UVT Aero fleet comprises the following aircraft (as of August 2017):

References

External links 
 UVT Aero official website 

Airlines of Russia
Airlines established in 2015
Russian companies established in 2015
Companies based in Kazan